Jakarta City Football Club (formerly known as Putra Citra Muda FC) is an Indonesian football club based in North Jakarta, Jakarta. They currently competes in Liga 3.

References

External links

North Jakarta
Sport in Jakarta
Football clubs in Indonesia
Football clubs in Jakarta
Association football clubs established in 2020
2020 establishments in Indonesia